Josef du Jardin (born 9 June 1934) is a Belgian basketball player. He competed in the men's tournament at the 1952 Summer Olympics.

References

1934 births
Living people
Belgian men's basketball players
Olympic basketball players of Belgium
Basketball players at the 1952 Summer Olympics
Sportspeople from Antwerp